Gerry McCoy (born 24 December 1960) is a Scottish former footballer, who played as a forward.

Career
He played for Queen's Park, Heart of Midlothian, Berwick Rangers, Partick Thistle, Falkirk, Dumbarton , Clyde and Albion Rovers. He also played for the Arsenal FC Under 16 team.

Partick Thistle

Gerry McCoy (age 23) made his debut appearance on Saturday, 10 March 1984, in a 2-1 win at home to Meadowbank Thistle in the SFL First Division. Gerry scored his first goal for Thistle on Saturday, 30 July 1988, in a 2-0 friendly win away to Alloa Athletic.

He played his last game for the club on Saturday, 7 October 1989, in a 1-0 win at home to Falkirk in the SFL First Division, having appeared as a Jag on 60 occasions.

References

1960 births
Living people
Footballers from Glasgow
Association football forwards
Scottish footballers
Queen's Park F.C. players
Heart of Midlothian F.C. players
Berwick Rangers F.C. players
Partick Thistle F.C. players
Falkirk F.C. players
Dumbarton F.C. players
Clyde F.C. players
Albion Rovers F.C. players
Glenafton Athletic F.C. players
Scottish Football League players